The ETR 200 (for "Elettro Treno Rapido 200", in Italian meaning "Rapid Electric Train series 200") is an Italian electric multiple unit (EMU) introduced in 1936.

On 20 July 1939 the ETR 200 number 12 obtained the world record average speed, between Bologna and Milan.

Development and records

In the 1930s, the Italian state railways, Ferrovie dello Stato, electrified the main line Milan-Bologna-Florence-Rome-Naples and needed a fast train to use on it and on other newly electrified ones. The project was started in 1934, using new technologies for steel and aerodynamics. The innovative nose of the train was developed after studies in the wind tunnel at the Politecnico di Torino engineering university.

The first example was built by Società Italiana Ernesto Breda, (now AnsaldoBreda), in 1936, an articulated and traction-distributed train with three cars on four bogies, two of which were Jacobs bogies, had a single T 62-R-100 motor, while the others—at the front and rear—were provided with two similar motors each.

The ETR 200 entered service in 1937 on the Bologna-Rome-Naples line. They were considered the most comfortable and fast trains in Europe, and Benito Mussolini had one sent to 1939 New York World's Fair.

A popular myth held that Benito Mussolini himself was at the controls, but this doesn't hold to historical evidence.

Later history

The production of the ETR 200 was halted by World War II, and many were damaged by Allied bombings. In the early 1960s the remaining sixteen units were converted to ETR 220/230/240 by adding a fourth car and making other improvements. They remained in service until the early 1980s, and were later used for charter trains up until the 1990s.

The ETR 232, former 212 (the unit making the 1939 record run), has been preserved as a historical train and is in full working order. Another non-working unit was first stored in Ancona until its scrapping in September 2012.

See also

High-speed rail in Italy
Land speed record for railed vehicles
Treno Alta Velocità

Notes

References

 
 

ETR 200
Breda multiple units
3000 V DC multiple units